Parkman Group plc was a leading firm of engineering consultants. It merged with Mouchel in 2003.

History
The consulting practice Ward Ashcroft was founded in Liverpool in 1888, predominantly as a water and public health business. In 1948, Brigadier Parkman joined the firm to create Ward Ashcroft and Parkman. By the mid-1960s it had diversified into highways and structural engineering and from the 1970s it had spread its wings internationally, working in Africa and Portugal and later Eastern Europe. The company advised on outsourcing following the rapid expansion of public sector term contracts in the 1980s. From the mid-1990s Parkman, as it was now known, moved into public sector property and housing, starting with the London Borough of Bexley, and in 1996 it won a Queens Award for Export Achievement.

In 2000, the company, previously management and staff-owned, underwent a management buy-out and by 2001 a significant shift took place in the company's turnover as it moved towards public sector outsourcing commissions. In 2001 it was floated on the London Stock Exchange.

In 2002, Parkman was named Financial Times New Company of the Year and the following year it was named as one of the Sunday Times Top 100 Best Companies to Work For.

Parkman Group plc's acquisitions included education consultant Full Circle in May 2002 and lighting design consultancy Atkins Odlin in July 2003.

Mouchel plc and Parkman Group plc announced plans to merge on 21 August 2003: the merger was completed in September 2003, forming the new company, Mouchel Parkman plc.

References

Consulting firms established in 1888
Defunct companies based in the West Midlands (county)
Defunct engineering companies of England
1888 establishments in England
Companies disestablished in 2003
2003 disestablishments in England
2003 mergers and acquisitions
Engineering consulting firms of the United Kingdom